King Sagato Alofi (18 September 1936 - 2002) was the Tu'i Agaifo 1997-2002. He was the son of Lomano Musulamu. In 2002 he died and was succeeded by Soane Patita Maituku.

He was invested as king on 19 July 1997.

References

1936 births
2002 deaths
Wallis and Futuna monarchs